Brasiliscincus is a genus of skinks. Species are endemic to Brazil. Species were previously placed in the genus Mabuya.

Species
The following 3 species, listed alphabetically by specific name, are recognized as being valid:

Brasiliscincus agilis (Raddi, 1823) 
Brasiliscincus caissara (Reboucas-Spieker, 1974) 
Brasiliscincus heathi (Schmidt & Inger, 1951) – Brazilian mabuya

Nota bene: A binomial authority in parentheses indicates that the species was originally described in a genus other than Brasiliscincus.

References

 
Lizard genera
Endemic fauna of Brazil
Reptiles of Brazil
Taxa named by Stephen Blair Hedges
Taxa named by Caitlin E. Conn